Colégio Militar is a military secondary school in Lisbon, Portugal.

Colégio militar in Portuguese or Colegio militar in Spanish ('military college') may also refer to:

Military schools and academies
 Colegio Militar Caldas, a military secondary school in Bogotá, Colombia
 Colegio Militar de la Nación, in El Palomar, Buenos Aires, Argentina

Transportation
 Colégio Militar/Luz (Lisbon Metro), a station of the Lisbon metro in Portugal
 Colegio Militar metro station, a station of the Mexico City metro system

See also
 
 Heroic Military Academy (Mexico)